Sir William Hood Treacher  (1 December 1849 – 3 May 1919) was a British colonial administrator in Borneo and the Straits Settlements. He founded the Anglo Chinese School in Klang on 10 March 1893.

Family
Treacher was the fourth son of Rev. Joseph Skipper Treacher, MA, Vicar of Sandford-on-Thames, by his first wife Pauline Louise Blanche Pierret. His father was an Oxford graduate.

On 19 April 1866, at the age of sixteen, Treacher matriculated at St Mary Hall, Oxford, where he held a Scholarship for four years. He graduated BA in 1870 and in 1881 proceeded to MA by seniority.

Cousin of John Gavaron Treacher, doctor in Sarawak from 1843 and Colonial Surgeon to Labuan from 1848, William arrived in Labuan via Singapore in 1871 to be Acting Police Magistrate, becoming Colonial Secretary of Labuan in 1873, going on to become the first Governor of North Borneo (1881–1887); Resident of Selangor (1892–1896); the sixth British Resident of Perak (1896–1902); and second Resident-General of British Malaya (1901–1904).

Treacher married Elizabeth Frances Cornelia Rumsey (known as Leila), the daughter of the Rev. J. Rumsey, at Ss Philip & James's Church in Oxford on 25 April 1881. Their daughter Leila Treacher was born in Singapore in 1882.

Sources and references 

 WorldStatesmen – Malaysia
 Walford's County Families of the United Kingdom (1920)
 The Suffrage Annual and Women's Who's who (1913), Stanley Paul

External links
 
 

1849 births
1919 deaths
History of Perak
Administrators in British Borneo
Alumni of St Mary Hall, Oxford
Governors of North Borneo
Administrators in British Malaya
Knights Commander of the Order of St Michael and St George